Memoirs of a Peasant Boy is a social and historical novel by Galician writer Xosé Neira Vilas published in Argentina on January 5, 1961. It is a book on the Galician field seen by the eyes of a child, and is the most read work of galician-language literature, with more than 600,000 copies sold by 2015. It is dedicated to all boys and all girls who speak Galician.

References

Galician literature
1961 books